Ancistrus damasceni is a species of catfish in the family Loricariidae. It is native to South America, where it occurs in the upper Parnaíba River basin in Brazil. The species reaches 6.5 cm (2.6 inches) SL.

References 

damasceni
Fish described in 1907
Fish of South America